In Thailand, many universities operate demonstration schools, also known as laboratory schools (sathit or satit schools) as part of their teacher-training programmes. These schools provide student teachers with practice-teaching opportunities, and are also used by the universities for education research and development. The oldest dedicated teacher-training schools in Thailand are the Prasarnmit and Patumwan Demonstration Schools of Srinakharinwirot University, which opened in 1953 and 1954, respectively. Many more schools have since been created or re-purposed, and there are now sixty-four demonstration schools in the country.

The large majority of Thai demonstration schools are operated by public universities, the lone exception being the Satit Bilingual School of Rangsit University, which is private. As they are effectively departments of the universities, demonstration schools don't come under the direct authority of the Ministry of Education, and have a greater degree of freedom in their operations than most state schools. They are generally viewed as providing higher-quality education, and entry into many demonstration schools is extremely competitive. This list is arranged with schools operated by public universities appearing first, followed by those of Rajabhat and Rajamangala Universities, then private institutions.

List of schools

Other university-affiliated schools
Some universities also operated schools which are not primarily used for teacher training, and are not considered to be conventional sathit schools. However, these schools operate under similar administration systems and are often grouped along with them in official lists. Such schools include:
Home Economics Kindergarten, Kasetsart University, Bangkok
Darunsikkhalai School for Innovative Learning, King Mongkut's University of Technology Thonburi, Bangkok
Somdej Ya Learning Community Demonstration School, Srinakharinwirot University, Chiang Mai
Child Development Center, Lampang Rajabhat University, Lampang
Child Development Center, National Institute for Child and Family Development, Mahidol University, Nakhon Pathom
Mahidol University International Demonstration School, Mahidol University, Nakhon Pathom
Vithidham School, Sakon Nakhon Rajabhat University, Sakon Nakhon
Child Development Center, College of Medicine and Public Health, Ubon Ratchathani University, Ubon Ratchathani

See also
List of schools in Thailand
List of universities and colleges in Thailand

References

Demonstration Schools